Derbyshire County Council is the upper-tier local authority for the non-metropolitan county of Derbyshire, England. It has 64 councillors representing 61 divisions, with three divisions having two members each. They are Glossop and Charlesworth, Alfreton and Somercotes, and Eckington and Killamarsh. The authority is controlled by the Conservative Party, who won control in the May 2017 local council election and retained control in the May 2021 elections.

The Leader of the Council is Barry Lewis. He heads a cabinet consisting of eight other members – those being Simon Spencer, Carol Hart, Natalie Hoy, Tony King, Carolyn Renwick, Kewal Singh Athwal, Julie Patten and Alex Dale. The cabinet members each have responsibility for particular functions of the council and are assisted by Cabinet Support Members.

History
The council was first set up in 1889 under the Local Government Act 1888, covering the administrative county. It was reconstituted in 1974 under the Local Government Act 1972 with some adjustments to its territory, most notably gaining Derby which had previously been a county borough independent from the county council. In 1997, the city of Derby left the area covered by the council becoming a unitary authority, but the city remains part of Derbyshire for ceremonial purposes. The council originally met at County Hall, Derby, a facility which was built in 1660. In 1955 the council moved to the current county hall in Matlock. This newer county hall is in a former hydrotherapy complex called Smedley's Hydro which was built in 1867.

District and Borough Councils
There are eight lower tier district/borough councils within the Derbyshire Council area:
Amber Valley Borough Council
Erewash Borough Council
Bolsover District Council
Chesterfield Borough Council
North East Derbyshire District Council
High Peak Borough Council
Derbyshire Dales District Council
South Derbyshire District Council

Political makeup

Elections are held every four years, the next one is due in 2025.

Cabinet/Lead Members

Notable former members
Dennis Skinner (1964-1970), later member of parliament for Bolsover
David Bookbinder  (Leader: 1981-1992), controversial leader of County Council 
Sir Martin Doughty (Leader: 1992-2001)
Andrew Lewer MBE (2005-2014 Leader 2009-2013), later member of European Parliament for East Midlands

References

External links
Derbyshire County Council

Local government in Derbyshire
County councils of England
1889 establishments in England
Local education authorities in England
Local authorities in Derbyshire
Major precepting authorities in England
Leader and cabinet executives